Riley Dederick Kern Herbst (born February 24, 1999) is an American professional stock car racing driver. He competes full-time in the NASCAR Xfinity Series, driving the No. 98 Ford Mustang for Stewart-Haas Racing and part-time in the NASCAR Cup Series, driving the No. 15 Ford Mustang for Rick Ware Racing.

Racing career

Early years
Herbst began racing karts as a five-year-old. He progressed through legends, Speed Trucks, and Super Late Models.

In 2015, he raced weekly at Irwindale Speedway in a Super Late Model as well as winning the track's Speed Trucks championship. In 2016, he raced several NASCAR East and West series races along with racing a Super Late Model at Irwindale.

Off-road racing
Herbst is from a family rooted in off-road racing. His father Troy, grandfather Jerry, and uncles Ed and Tim participate in desert racing such as the Baja 500 and Baja 1000. The quartet was inducted into the Southern Nevada Sports Hall of Fame in 2014.

During his youth, Herbst competed in the Lucas Oil Off Road Racing Series' Junior 1 Kart division.

In 2020, he joined his cousins Pierce and Thor at the 2020 Baja 1000, where they finished second in the Trophy Truck Spec class. The trio also ran the 2021 1000 and placed ninth.

ARCA Menards Series

In 2017, Herbst drove full-time for Joe Gibbs Racing in the No. 18 Toyota in the ARCA Racing Series. He drove the No. 81 in the first race but withdrew due to age limitations. He then moved to the No. 18 for the rest of the season. He won one race at Pocono, earned top-fives, 10 top-tens, and finished seventh in the final standings. He also claimed the series' Rookie of the Year award over Gus Dean after passing Dean in the season's final event. For the 2019 season, he split JGR's No. 18 with Ty Gibbs.

Xfinity Series

In May 2018, Herbst was named to the 2018 NASCAR Next class. In June 2018, Herbst joined JGR for his NASCAR Xfinity Series debut at Iowa Speedway. For the 2019 season, he split JGR's No. 18 with Jeffrey Earnhardt, Kyle Busch, and Denny Hamlin.

In 2020, Herbst assumed full-time driving duties in the No. 18. He qualified for the playoffs but was eliminated following the first round. He ended the year with a 12th-place points finish, four top-five finishes, 17 top tens, and a best finish of second at Auto Club Speedway and Kentucky Speedway. After the season, JGR signed Daniel Hemric to drive the No. 18 full-time starting in 2021, leaving Herbst without a ride. 

On December 10, 2020, Stewart-Haas Racing announced Herbst would drive the No. 98 Ford beginning with the 2021 season. After a rough start to the season that saw his involvement in wrecks—none of which were of his doing—in three of the first four races, he rebounded with a fourth-place finish at Phoenix Raceway. In 2022, Herbst would have his best season in his Xfinity career; his 8 Top 5 and 20 Top 10 finishes during the season were all career-highs.

Truck Series
In 2018, Herbst was tabbed to drive for Kyle Busch Motorsports. He made his NASCAR Camping World Truck Series debut in the No. 51 at Gateway Motorsports Park finishing 8th and the No. 46 at his home track, Las Vegas Motor Speedway finishing 29th.

On October 12, 2019, Herbst was passing Johnny Sauter on the final lap for the win in the tri-oval at Talladega Superspeedway but was blocked across the apron forcing NASCAR to penalize Sauter and give Spencer Boyd his first career win, Herbst would finish third.

Herbst returned to the Truck Series in February 2021 for the Daytona road course race, driving the No. 17 Ford for David Gilliland Racing. He returned to the No. 17 truck for Daytona and Kansas in 2022.

Cup Series
On January 31, 2023, Herbst was announced to have signed with Rick Ware Racing to make his Cup Series debut in the No. 15 Ford at the 2023 Daytona 500. Herbst would go on to finish tenth in his debut despite being involved in a multi car crash late in the race.

Personal life
Herbst's family owns the Terrible Herbst company.

Motorsports career results

NASCAR
(key) (Bold – Pole position awarded by qualifying time. Italics – Pole position earned by points standings or practice time. * – Most laps led.)

Cup Series

Daytona 500

Xfinity Series

Camping World Truck Series

 Season still in progress
 Ineligible for series points

K&N Pro Series East

K&N Pro Series West

Pinty's Series

ARCA Menards Series
(key) (Bold – Pole position awarded by qualifying time. Italics – Pole position earned by points standings or practice time. * – Most laps led.)

References

External links

 

Living people
1999 births
ARCA Menards Series drivers
Bishop Gorman High School alumni
NASCAR drivers
Racing drivers from Las Vegas
Racing drivers from Nevada
Joe Gibbs Racing drivers
Kyle Busch Motorsports drivers
Stewart-Haas Racing drivers